Dan Houx is an American politician and businessman serving as a member of the Missouri House of Representatives from the 54th district. Elected in 2016, he assumed office in January 2017.

Early life and education 
Houx was born and raised in Warrensburg, Missouri. He graduated from the Kemper Military School in Boonville, Missouri.

Career 
In addition to his career in politics, Houx has worked as a homebuilder, real estate developer, and real estate agent. Houx was elected to the Missouri House of Representatives in 2016, defeating Democratic nominee Bob Gregory. He was re-elected in 2018, 2020, and 2022.

Electoral History 
 Dan Houx has not yet had any opponents running against him in the Republican primary, thus getting nominated each time by default.

References 

Living people
People from Warrensburg, Missouri
Republican Party members of the Missouri House of Representatives
Kemper Military School alumni
21st-century American politicians
Year of birth missing (living people)